Oakland Normal Institute was a private academy in Yale, Mississippi, that provided students a classical education in art and Latin, as well as education and business courses. It was established in 1887, and remained open until 1904, when it became a county school.

History 
The original two-story building was torn down in the 1930s, and a one-story building was erected using much of the older building. The Oakland School, serving grades 1 through 8, was closed in 1954. In the 1950s a historic marker was erected at the school site, by former alumni of the Oakland Normal Institute. The building was renovated in 2004 and is now a Mississippi Historical Landmark.

Notable alumni include T. Jeff Busby, a U.S. Representative from Mississippi, and John Breckinridge, a U.S. Attorney General.

References

External links 

 Oakland Normal Institute at Historical Marker Database

1887 establishments in Mississippi
1904 disestablishments in Mississippi
Buildings and structures in Itawamba County, Mississippi
Defunct private schools in the United States
Demolished school buildings and structures in the United States
Education in Itawamba County, Mississippi
Educational institutions established in 1887
Educational institutions disestablished in 1904
Former school buildings in the United States
Mississippi Landmarks
Protected areas of Itawamba County, Mississippi
Rebuilt buildings and structures in Mississippi
School buildings completed in 1930
Wooden buildings and structures in the United States